The 1979 Sacramento State Hornets football team represented California State University, Sacramento as a member of the Far Western Conference (FWC) during the 1979 NCAA Division II football season. Led by second-year head coach Bob Mattos, Sacramento State compiled an overall record of 3–7 with a mark of 2–3 in conference play, placing in a three-way tie for fourth place the FWC. The team was outscored by its opponents 196 to 121 for the season. The Hornets played home games at Hornet Stadium in Sacramento, California.

Cal Poly Pomona was later determined to have used ineligible players during the 1979 season. As such, they were required to forfeit three games, including their non-conference victory over Sacramento State on September 29. With the forfeit, the Hornets' overall record improved to 4–6.

Schedule

References

Sacramento State
Sacramento State Hornets football seasons
Sacramento State Hornets football